Festuca argentina is a species of grass and a perennial herb, these species have a self-supporting growth form. This species is endemic to native to Argentina. This species often thrive in mountain slopes.

Characteristics
Festuca argentina can grow up to 28 centimetres, and have simple but broad leaves.This species can clump to a meter high wlong with a long growth period. This species is poisnous to cattle and goats as when consumed, causes a condition called huaicú disease, which can interrupt the reproductive system among cattles, this often happens when overgrazing occurs. Due to its appearance, it can stand out amongst many grasses.

References

argentina